Eduardo Enríquez Maya (11 October 1948 – 14 April 2021) was a Colombian politician.

Biography
A member of the Colombian Conservative Party, he served in the Chamber of Representatives of Colombia from 1998 to 2006 and the Senate of Colombia from 2006 until his death from COVID-19 in Bogotá on 14 April 2021 at the age of 72.

References

1948 births
2021 deaths
Colombian politicians
Members of the Senate of Colombia
Members of the Chamber of Representatives of Colombia
Colombian Conservative Party politicians
People from Nariño Department
Deaths from the COVID-19 pandemic in Colombia